Gordo High School is a public secondary school located in Gordo, Alabama. The school was established in 1898.

Location
Gordo High School is located in West Alabama in eastern Pickens County off of U.S Highway 82. The high school serves the residents of Gordo and its surrounding areas as well as some students from the Carrollton area for grades 7–12. The enrollment total for the 2008–2009 school year was 541 students. The school faculty is currently headed by Principal Mark Capps. The School Motto is GREENWAVE, an acronym meaning: Guides Respectful, responsible, and productive students, Encourages Every learner, Nurtures the Well-being of All, and Values Each individual.

Athletics
The Greenwave participate in football, baseball, wrestling, softball, and boys and girls basketball. In total, Gordo is a eight-time state champion. The football team garnered championships in 2A in 1968, 1980, and 2001 with a 3A championship in 1985. The baseball team won back-to-back 2A championships coming in 2002-03. The next baseball state championship came in 2011 in 3A. The most recent came in 2017 in 3A vs Piedmont High School. The Lady Waves Basketball team had their first sub-regional win and made their first regional appearance during the 2017–2018 season.

Band
The Grenadier Marching Band has won numerous awards and also hosts the annual West Alabama Marching Band Festival. The motto of the band is "We Winna Be Dunted", which means "we will not be defeated".

References

External links

Public high schools in Alabama
Schools in Pickens County, Alabama
Educational institutions established in 1898
Public middle schools in Alabama
1898 establishments in Alabama